Crystal Light is an American brand of powdered and artificially sweetened beverage mixes produced by Kraft Heinz. It was introduced in 1982 to a test market and released to the public in April 1984. General Foods, a now defunct company, were the original sellers of the product, but now it is sold by Kraft Foods.  It is available in a wide variety of flavors, such  as lemonade, sweet tea, and fruit punch.

History

Test marketing and introduction
Crystal Light was sold in test markets beginning in 1982. As of mid-1983, it was being sold in 11 test areas. It was introduced throughout the United States in April 1984. General Foods sold $150 million of Crystal Light during the product's first year on national markets, representing 20% of all powdered drink mixes and 2/3 of all sugar-free drink mixes in the United States.

Advertisements 
A 1985 commercial featuring Linda Evans showed her doing aerobics in a women's gym and drinking Crystal Light. Another undated commercial used a similar format, showing Evans exercising and drinking Crystal Light in a women's gym. Her final commercial, airing in 1987 or 1988, featuring her stuck in traffic in a limousine and performing a variety of difficult stunts, ultimately ending up on a boat drinking Crystal Light. Many of her print advertisements for the brand featured her in workout attire.

A 1986 commercial featuring Priscilla Presley showed her practicing karate in a dojo while drinking Crystal Light.

A 1987 commercial featuring Raquel Welch showed her singing and dancing in a blue jumpsuit and, once finished with her performance, shunning a can of Diet Coke in favor of Crystal Light.

Ingredients 
Crystal Light is sweetened with a combination of aspartame, acesulfame potassium, sucralose, and/or sugar depending on the specific product line and flavor.
First packaged in multi-serve canisters, Crystal Light launched single-serve "On The Go" packets in 2004. In 2009, Crystal Light redesigned its multi-serve packaging. On a finished case goods basis, the new design uses 250 tons less packaging than the original. In 2010, Crystal Light launched Pure Fitness, a "naturally-sweetened" low-calorie fitness drink mix which is sweetened with sugar and Truvia, a sweetener derived from the stevia plant. It is currently sold in "On The Go" packets. In 2011, Crystal Light Pure Fitness was renamed Crystal Light Pure, and three additional flavors were introduced.  In April 2012, several Crystal Light varieties were added to the line of sodamix syrups for SodaStream home soda makers.

Kraft Heinz, the parent company of Crystal Light, offers a product locator on its website to help locate flavors in a desired location. Crystal Light is sold in the U.S. and Canada.

Calories per serving have varied throughout the years; non-zero calorie flavors were once as low as 4 calories in 1990 and now, they may be as high as 15 in 2018, depending on flavor. However, it's not certain if the change is due to the use of new ingredients or if serving sizes have increased.

Products 
All product information is based on information and products offered by Crystal Light's official website, as of January 2019.

Classics 

 Berry Sangria (0 cal)
 Black Cherry Lime (0 cal)
 Blackberry Lemonade (0 cal)
 Blueberry Raspberry (0 cal)
 Cherry Pomegranate (15 cal)
 Concord Grape (15 cal)
 Fruit Punch (15 cal)
 Lemonade (15 cal)
 Mango Passionfruit (0 cal)
 Orange (15 cal)
 Pink Lemonade (15 cal)
 Pomegranate Lemonade (0 cal)
 Raspberry Ice (15 cal)
 Raspberry Lemonade (15 cal)
 Strawberry Kiwi (15 cal)
 Strawberry Lemonade (0 cal)
 Strawberry Orange Banana (15 cal)
 Strawberry Watermelon (15 cal)
 Sweet Tea
 Tropical Coconut (0 cal)

Pure 

 Grape (5 cal)
 Lemon (5 cal)
 Lemon Iced Tea (5 cal)
 Mixed Berry Energy (15 cal)
 Peach Iced Tea (5 cal)
 Raspberry Lemonade (5 cal)
 Strawberry Kiwi (5 cal)
 Strawberry Lemonade Energy (15 cal)
 Tangerine Mango (5 cal)
 Tropical Blend (5 cal)
 Tropical Citrus Energy (15 cal)

References

External links
 

American soft drink brands
Kraft Foods brands
Non-alcoholic drinks
Products introduced in 1982